Match Made in Heaven is the second season of the reality dating show featuring an African-American businessman, motivational speaker and former NFL/CFL football linebacker named Stevie Baggs.

Cast

Episodes

References
1. http://www.wetv.com/shows/match-made-in-heaven/episodes#episodes

2016 American television seasons